The Banbury child sex abuse ring was a group of six men who committed serious sexual offences against under-aged girls in the English town of Banbury, Oxfordshire. In March 2015, they were found guilty of offences including rape and sexual activity with a child over a period extending from 2009 to 2014. Police in Banbury had drawn on the lessons of Operation Bullfinch, which targeted sexual abuse in nearby Oxford.

Crimes
The men targeted vulnerable girls using social media to organize parties at which the girls were groomed. The men used gifts and apparent displays of affection towards the girls, winning their trust before initiating abusive sexual relationships. Offences took place in cars, woods and in the men's private homes. Charges concerning seven victims aged from 13 to 15 were included in the prosecution case. The offences were rape, sexual activity with a child and inciting a child to engage in sexual activity.

Members
The six men were named as:

One man was acquitted of all charges in court.
 
In March 2017 several others were arrested in connection with raping young girls.

Reaction in Banbury and Parliament
Detective Inspector Steve Raffield of Banbury police was quoted as saying that the offenders "abused the trust of the vulnerable young victims for the purpose of their own sexual gratification". He described the offences as "horrific" crimes that would "have a lasting impact upon the victims’ lives." He condemned the offenders for pleading not guilty and forcing the victims "to relive their experiences by giving evidence in court." He concluded by thanking the victims for the courage they showed in giving evidence, which had helped secure convictions of the accused men.

The Banbury MP Sir Tony Baldry was disturbed by tactics used by the defence during the trial, writing to the Lord Chancellor to express his concern at reference to the victims as willing participants who were falsely claiming abuse because “it is better to be a victim than a slag”. Defence counsel also alleged the case had been "manufactured" by the police and that the victims had been "brain-washed by social workers".

See also
List of sexual abuses perpetrated by groups

References

External links
 Banbury sex exploitation trial: Offenders subjected girls to ‘horrific’ offences The Banbury Guardian, 6 March 2015

Child prostitution in the United Kingdom
British people convicted of child sexual abuse
Crime in Oxfordshire
Incidents of violence against girls